The following is a list of Teen Choice Award winners and nominees for Choice TV Actress - Action. This award was first introduced (along with Choice TV Actor - Action and Choice TV - Action) in 2008.

Winners and nominees

2000s

2010s

References

 

Action Actress
Awards for actresses